Hot Country Songs and Country Airplay are charts that rank the top-performing country music songs in the United States, published by Billboard magazine.  Hot Country Songs ranks songs based on digital downloads, streaming, and airplay, not only from country stations but from stations of all formats, a methodology introduced in 2012.  Country Airplay, which was published for the first time in 2012, is based solely on country radio airplay, a methodology which had previously been used for several decades for Hot Country Songs.  In 2015, 10 different songs topped the Hot Country Songs chart and 39 different songs topped Country Airplay in 52 issues of the magazine.

In the first issue of Billboard of the year, Craig Wayne Boyd entered the Hot Country Songs chart at number one with "My Baby's Got a Smile on Her Face".  Boyd, winner of the seventh season of NBC's reality TV singing competition The Voice, was only the second artist in the chart's 57-year history to enter at number one.  The following week, however, the song dropped off the chart completely, meaning that its entire chart run consisted of a single week at number one.  In addition to Boyd, one other artist was a first-time chart-topper on Hot Country Songs.  Following a critically acclaimed performance at the 49th Country Music Association Awards, Chris Stapleton's version of "Tennessee Whiskey", which had spent a single week at number 46 six months earlier, re-entered at number one, despite never having been officially released as a single or serviced to radio.  Nine acts gained their first career country number ones by topping the airplay listing.  Ashley Monroe made her first appearance at number one under her own name when she featured on Blake Shelton's hit "Lonely Tonight", although she had previously reached the top spot as part of the group Pistol Annies, who had been featured on another of Shelton's songs two years earlier.  Between May and August, Tyler Farr, Kelsea Ballerini, Canaan Smith, Michael Ray, and the band A Thousand Horses were all first-time chart-toppers, as was Grace Potter, who was featured on veteran country star Kenny Chesney's song "Wild Child".  Later in the year, the band Old Dominion and the duo Dan + Shay made their first appearances at number one.

The group Little Big Town had the longest unbroken run at number one on Hot Country Songs, spending 13 consecutive weeks in the top spot with "Girl Crush" during the summer.  Sam Hunt had the highest total number of weeks at number one, spending a total of 17 weeks atop the chart with "Take Your Time" and "House Party".  Hunt was one of two acts with more than one chart-topper on the hybrid listing, along with Luke Bryan, who reached number one with "I See You", "Kick the Dust Up" and "Strip It Down".  On the Country Airplay listing, songs had much shorter runs at number one; no song spent more than three consecutive weeks in the top spot, a feat achieved by three songs during the year: "Homegrown" by the Zac Brown Band, "Save It for a Rainy Day" by Kenny Chesney and "I'm Comin' Over" by Chris Young.  Chesney and Bryan tied for the most total weeks at number one, each spending five weeks in total atop the chart.  The two singers also tied with Blake Shelton for the highest number of individual number ones, each taking three songs to the top spot during 2015.  At the end of the year, Shelton was at number one on the airplay chart with "Gonna" and Thomas Rhett held the top position on Hot Country Songs with "Die a Happy Man", which would ultimately spend a total of 17 weeks at number one.

Chart history

See also
2015 in music
List of artists who reached number one on the U.S. country chart
List of number-one country albums of 2015 (U.S.)
List of number-one country singles of 2015 (Canada)

References

2015
Number-one country singles
United States Country Singles